WISS (1100 kHz) or Oshkosh Air Support is an American AM radio station broadcasting a progressive talk format featuring local news and information as well as statewide programming originating from the Civic Media network.  It is licensed to Berlin, Wisconsin, United States, serving central Wisconsin and Fox Valley.  It used to operate at 1090 kHz.  The station is owned by Civic Media LLC, acquired in 2022.

WISS changed its music format from classic country to soft oldies on February 2, 2009. Artists heard as part of the new format, according to the station's website, include The Beatles, Carpenters, The Supremes, Barry Manilow, Anne Murray, Frank Sinatra, Kenny Rogers, and Neil Diamond.

The station ran an annual trivia contest between 1982 and 2005. The contest was billed as the "world's longest running commercial trivia contest" before its end in 2006.

It has added a simulcast on 97.3 FM because AM 1100 does not operate all day. The 97.3 simulcast is available 24 hours a day, and is in operation before, during, and after AM 1100 is on the air.

On May 5, 2011, WISS replaced classic hits with news/talk introducing themselves as a Fox News Radio station.

In 2014 WISS received a U.S. Federal Communications Commission construction permit to increase power to 50,000 watts day and 20,000 watts critical hours.  The power increase was never built.

On May 9, 2016, WISS changed its format from news/talk to classic hits, simulcasting WAUH 102.3 FM Wautoma and the translator moved from 97.3 FM Berlin to 98.7 FM Oshkosh.

On October 7, 2022, Civic Media acquired WISS, dropped its simulcast with WAUH and changed its format to progressive news/talk as "Air Support Radio". With the format change WISS opened a new studio in downtown Oshkosh with the intention of originating local programming.

See also
WISS Trivia Contest

Translators
In addition to the main station, WISS is relayed by an additional translator to widen its broadcast area.

Previous logo

References

External links

WISS Radio official website
Hometown Broadcasting LLC
Radio Station World Appleton/Oshkosh/Fond du Lac stations

ISS
Green Lake County, Wisconsin
Waushara County, Wisconsin
News and talk radio stations in the United States
Progressive talk radio
Radio stations established in 1971
1971 establishments in Wisconsin
ISS